Pembrokeshire is a county in the south-west of Wales. It is bordered by Carmarthenshire to the east, Ceredigion to the northeast, and the rest by sea. The county is home to Pembrokeshire Coast National Park. The Park occupies more than a third of the area of the county and includes the Preseli Hills in the north as well as the  Pembrokeshire Coast Path.

Historically, mining and fishing were important activities, while industry nowadays is focused on agriculture (86 per cent of land use), oil and gas, and tourism; Pembrokeshire's beaches have won many awards. The county has a diverse geography with a wide range of geological features, habitats and wildlife. Its prehistory and modern history have been extensively studied, from tribal occupation, through Roman times, to Welsh, Irish, Norman, English, Scandinavian and Flemish influences.

Pembrokeshire County Council's headquarters are in the county town of Haverfordwest. The council has a majority of Independent members, but the county's representatives in both the Senedd and UK Parliament are Conservative. Pembrokeshire's population was 122,439 at the 2011 census, an increase of 7.2 per cent from the 2001 figure of 114,131. Ethnically, the county is 99 per cent white and, for historical reasons, Welsh is more widely spoken in the north of the county than in the south.

Settlements
See List of places in Pembrokeshire for a comprehensive list of settlements in Pembrokeshire.

The county town is Haverfordwest. Other towns include Pembroke, Pembroke Dock, Milford Haven, Fishguard, Tenby, Narberth, Neyland and Newport. In the west of the county, St Davids is the United Kingdom's smallest city in terms of both size and population (1,841 in 2011). Saundersfoot is the most populous village (more than 2,500 inhabitants) in Pembrokeshire. Less than 4 per cent of the county, according to CORINE, is built-on or green urban.

Geography

Climate

There are three weather stations in Pembrokeshire: at Tenby, Milford Haven and Penycwm, all on the coast. Milford Haven enjoys a mild climate and Tenby shows a similar range of temperatures throughout the year, while at Penycwm, on the west coast and 100m above sea level, temperatures are slightly lower.

The county has on average the highest coastal winter temperatures in Wales due to its proximity to the relatively warm Atlantic Ocean.  Inland, average temperatures tend to fall 0.5 °C for each 100 metres increase in height.

The air pollution rating of Pembrokeshire is "Good", the lowest rating.

Geology
The rocks in the county were formed between 600 and 290 million years ago. More recent rock formations were eroded when sea levels rose 80 million years ago, at the end of the Cretaceous Period. Around 60 million years ago, the Pembrokeshire landmass emerged through a combination of uplift and falling sea levels; the youngest rocks, from the Carboniferous Period, contain the Pembrokeshire Coalfield. The landscape was subject to considerable change as a result of ice ages; about 20,000 years ago the area was scraped clean of soil and vegetation by the ice sheet; subsequently, meltwater deepened the existing river valleys. While Pembrokeshire is not usually a seismically active area, in August 1892 there was a series of pronounced activities (maximum intensity: 7) over a six-day period.

Coastline and landscape

The Pembrokeshire coastline includes numerous bays and sandy beaches. The Pembrokeshire Coast National Park, the only park in the UK established primarily because of its coastline, occupies more than a third of the county. The National Trust owns  of Pembrokeshire's coast. The large estuary and natural harbour of Milford Haven cuts deep into the coast; this inlet is formed by the confluence of the Western Cleddau (which flows through Haverfordwest), the Eastern Cleddau, and rivers Cresswell and Carew. Since 1975, the estuary has been bridged by the Cleddau Bridge, a toll bridge carrying the A477 between Neyland and Pembroke Dock. Large bays are Newport Bay, Fishguard Bay, St Bride's Bay and western Carmarthen Bay. There are several small islands off the Pembrokeshire coast, the largest of which are Ramsey, Grassholm, Skokholm, Skomer and Caldey. The seas around Skomer and Skokholm, and some other areas off the Pembrokeshire coast are Marine protected areas.

There are many known shipwrecks off the Pembrokeshire coast with many more undiscovered. A Viking wreck off The Smalls has protected status. The county has six lifeboat stations, the earliest of which was established in 1822; in 2015 a quarter of all Royal National Lifeboat Institution Welsh rescues took place off the Pembrokeshire coast.

Pembrokeshire's diverse range of geological features was a key factor in the establishment of the Pembrokeshire Coast National Park and a number of sites of special scientific interest (SSSIs). In the north of the county are the Preseli Hills, a wide stretch of high moorland supporting sheep farming and some forestry, with many prehistoric sites and the probable source of the bluestones used in the construction of the inner circle of Stonehenge in England. Elsewhere in the county most of the land (86 per cent according to CORINE) is used for farming, compared with 60 per cent for Wales as a whole.

Wildlife
Pembrokeshire's wildlife is diverse, with marine, estuary, ancient woodland, moorland and farmland habitats. The county has a number of seasonal seabird breeding sites, including for razorbill, guillemot, puffin and Manx shearwater, and rare endemic species such as the red-billed chough; Grassholm has a large gannet colony. Seals, several species of whales (including a rare humpback whale sighting in 2021), dolphins and porpoises can be seen off the Pembrokeshire coast; whale-watching boat trips are frequent, particularly during the summer months. An appeal for otter sightings in 2014 yielded more than 100 responses, and a rare visit by a walrus occurred in the spring of 2021.

Pembrokeshire is one of the few places in the UK that is home to the rare Southern damselfly, Coenagrion mercuriale, which is found at several locations in the county, and whose numbers have been boosted by conservation work over a number of years.

History

Human habitation of the region that is now Pembrokeshire extends back to between 125,000 and 70,000 years and there are numerous prehistoric sites such as Pentre Ifan, and neolithic remains (12,000 to 6,500 years ago), more of which were revealed in an aerial survey during the 2018 heatwave; in the same year, a 1st-century Celtic chariot burial was discovered, the first such find in Wales. There may have been dairy farming in Neolithic times.

Roman period

There is little evidence of Roman occupation in what is now Pembrokeshire. Ptolemy's Geography, written , mentioned some coastal places, two of which have been identified as the River Teifi and what is now St Davids Head, but most Roman writers did not mention the area; there may have been a Roman settlement near St Davids and a road from Bath, but this comes from a 14th-century writer. Any evidence for villas or Roman building materials reported by mediaeval or later writers has not been verified, though some remains near Dale were tentatively identified as Roman in character by topographer Richard Fenton in his Historical Tour of 1810. Fenton stated that he had "...reason to be of opinion that they had not colonized Pembrokeshire till near the decline of their empire in Britain".

Part of a possible Roman road is noted by CADW near Llanddewi Velfrey, and another near Wiston. Wiston is also the location of the first Roman fort discovered in Pembrokeshire, investigated in 2013.

Some artefacts, including coins and weapons, have been found, but it is not clear whether these belonged to Romans or to a Romanised population. Welsh tradition has it that Magnus Maximus founded Haverfordwest, and took a large force of local men on campaign in Gaul in 383 which, together with the reduction of Roman forces in south Wales, left a defensive vacuum which was filled by incomers from Ireland.

Sub-Roman period

Between 350 and 400, an Irish tribe known as the Déisi settled in the region known to the Romans as Demetae. The Déisi merged with the local Welsh, with the regional name underlying Demetae evolving into Dyfed, which existed as an independent petty kingdom from the 5th century. In 904, Hywel Dda married Elen (died 943), daughter of the king of Dyfed Llywarch ap Hyfaidd, and merged Dyfed with his own maternal inheritance of Seisyllwg, forming the new realm of Deheubarth ("southern district"). Between the Roman and Norman periods, the region was subjected to raids from Vikings, who established settlements and trading posts at Haverfordwest, Fishguard, Caldey Island and elsewhere.

Norman period

Dyfed remained an integral province of Deheubarth, but this was contested by invading Normans and Flemings who arrived between 1067 and 1111. The region became known as Pembroke (sometimes archaic "Penbroke"), after the Norman castle built in the cantref of Penfro. In 1136, Prince Owain Gwynedd at Crug Mawr near Cardigan met and destroyed a 3,000-strong Norman/Flemish army and incorporated Deheubarth into Gwynedd. 
Norman/Flemish influence never fully recovered in West Wales. In 1138, the county of Pembrokeshire was named as a county palatine. Rhys ap Gruffydd, the son of Owain Gwynedd's daughter Gwenllian, re-established Welsh control over much of the region and threatened to retake all of Pembrokeshire, but died in 1197. After Deheubarth was split by a dynastic feud, Llywelyn the Great almost succeeded in retaking the region of Pembroke between 1216 and his death in 1240. In 1284 the Statute of Rhuddlan was enacted to introduce the English common law system to Wales, heralding 100 years of peace, but had little effect on those areas already established under the Marcher Lords, such as Cemais in the north of the county.

Middle ages

Henry Tudor, born at Pembroke Castle in 1457, landed an army in Pembrokeshire in 1485 and marched to Cardigan. Rallying support, he continued to Leicestershire and defeated the larger army of Richard III at the Battle of Bosworth Field. As Henry VII, he became the first monarch of the House of Tudor, which ruled England until 1603.

The Laws in Wales Act 1535 effectively abolished the powers of the Marcher Lords and divided the county into seven hundreds, roughly corresponding to the seven pre-Norman cantrefi of Dyfed. The hundreds were (clockwise from the northeast): Cilgerran, Cemais, Dewisland, Roose, Castlemartin, Narberth and Dungleddy and each was divided into civil parishes; a 1578 map in the British Library is the earliest known to show parishes and chapelries in Pembrokeshire. The Elizabethan era brought renewed prosperity to the county through an opening up of rural industries, including agriculture, mining and fishing, with exports to England and Ireland, though the formerly staple woollen industry had all but disappeared.

During the First English Civil War (1642–1646) the county gave strong support to the Roundheads (Parliamentarians), in contrast to the rest of Wales, which was staunchly Royalist. In spite of this, an incident in Pembrokeshire triggered the opening shots of the Second English Civil War when local units of the New Model Army mutinied. Oliver Cromwell defeated the uprising at the Siege of Pembroke in July 1648. On 13 August 1649, the Cromwellian conquest of Ireland began when New Model Army forces sailed from Milford Haven.

18th and 19th centuries

In 1791 a petition was presented to the House of Commons concerning the poor state of many of the county's roads, pointing out that repairs could not be made compulsory by the law as it stood. The petition was referred to committee. People applying for poor relief were often put to work mending roads. Workhouses were poorly documented. Under the Poor Laws, costs and provisions were kept to a minimum, but the emphasis was often on helping people to be self-employed. While the Poor Laws provided a significant means of support, there were many charitable and benefit societies. After the Battle of Fishguard, the failed French invasion of 1797, 500 French prisoners were held at Golden Hill Farm, Pembroke. From 1820 to 1878 one of the county's prisons, with a capacity of 86, was in the grounds of Haverfordwest Castle. In 1831, the area of the county was calculated to be  with a population of 81,424.

It was not until nearly the end of the 19th century that mains water was provided to rural south Pembrokeshire by means of a reservoir at Rosebush and cast iron water pipes throughout the district.

20th century

Throughout much of the 20th century (1911 to 1961) the population density in the county remained stable while it rose in England and Wales as a whole. There was considerable military activity in Pembrokeshire and offshore in the 20th century: a naval base at Milford Haven because German U-boats were active off the coast in World War I and, in World War II, military exercises in the Preseli Hills and a number of military airfields. The wartime increase in air activity saw a number of aircraft accidents and fatalities, often due to unfamiliarity with the terrain. From 1943 to 1944, 5,000 soldiers from the United States Army's 110th Infantry Regiment were based in the county, preparing for D-Day. Military and industrial targets in the county were subjected to bombing during World War II. After the end of the war, German prisoners of war were accommodated in Pembrokeshire, the largest prison being at Haverfordwest, housing 600. The County of Pembroke War Memorial in Haverfordwest carries the names of 1,200 of those that perished in World War I.

In 1972, a second reservoir for south Pembrokeshire, at Llys y Fran, was completed.

Demography

Population
Pembrokeshire's population was 122,439 at the 2011 census.

Language
As a result of differential immigration over hundreds of years, such as the influx of Flemish people, the south of the county has fewer Welsh-speaking inhabitants (about 15 per cent) than the north (about 50 per cent). The rough line that can be drawn between the two regions, illustrated by the map, is known as the Landsker Line, and the area south of the line has been termed "Little England Beyond Wales". The first objective, statistically based description of this demarcation was made in the 1960s, but the distinction was remarked upon as early as 1603 by George Owen of Henllys. A 21st century introduction of Welsh place names for villages which had previously been known locally only by their English names has caused some controversy.

Religion
The 2001 census for Preseli Pembrokeshire constituency showed that 74 per cent were Christian and 25 per cent of no religion (or not stated), with other religions totalling less than 1 per cent. This approximates to the figures for the whole of Wales.

Ethnicity
In 2001, Preseli Pembrokeshire constituency was 99 per cent white European, marginally lower than in 1991, compared with 98 per cent for the whole of Wales. 71 per cent identified their place of birth as Wales and 26 per cent as from elsewhere in the UK.

Governance, politics and public services

Under the Local Government Act 1888, an elected county council was set up to take over the functions of the Pembrokeshire Quarter Sessions. It was based at the Shire Hall, Haverfordwest. This and the administrative county of Pembrokeshire were abolished under the Local Government Act 1972, with Pembrokeshire forming two districts of the new county of Dyfed: South Pembrokeshire and Preseli – the split being made at the request of local authorities in the area. In 1996, under the Local Government (Wales) Act 1994, the county of Dyfed was broken up into its constituent parts, and Pembrokeshire has been a unitary authority since then. A new County Hall was built in 1999 in Haverfordwest and serves as the county council's headquarters. In 2017 Pembrokeshire County Council had 60 members and no political party in overall control; there were 34 independent councillors. In 2009, the question of county names and Royal Mail postal addresses was raised in the Westminster parliament; it was argued that Royal Mail's continued use of the county address Dyfed was causing concern and confusion in the Pembrokeshire business community. The Royal Mail has subsequently ceased requiring county names to be used in postal addresses. In 2018, Pembrokeshire County Council increased council tax by 12.5 per cent, the largest increase since 2004, but the county's council tax remains the lowest in Wales.

The Pembrokeshire (Communities) Order 2011 established the most recent arrangement of communities (the successors to civil parishes) in the county which have their own councils; see the foot of this page for a list of communities.

Since 2010, Pembrokeshire has returned two Conservative MPs to the Parliament of the United Kingdom at Westminster: Stephen Crabb for Preseli Pembrokeshire and Simon Hart for South Pembrokeshire which is represented jointly with West Carmarthenshire. The corresponding Members of the Senedd (MSs) returned to the Senedd (Welsh Parliament) in Cardiff are Paul Davies and Angela Burns respectively, both Conservatives.

Pembrokeshire is served by the Mid and West Wales Fire and Rescue Service and Dyfed-Powys Police.

Transport

The A40 crosses Pembrokeshire from the border with Carmarthenshire westwards to Haverfordwest, then northwards to Fishguard. The Cleddau Bridge, toll-free from 28 March 2019, carries the A477 across the Cleddau Estuary. The A487 is the other major route, running northwest from Haverfordwest to St Davids, then northeast following the coast, through Fishguard and Newport, to the boundary with Ceredigion at Cardigan. Owing to length restrictions in Fishguard, some freight vehicles are not permitted to travel northeast from Fishguard but must take a longer route via Haverfordwest and Narberth. The B4329 former turnpike runs from Eglwyswrw in the north to Haverfordwest across the Preseli Hills.

The main towns in the county are covered by regular bus and train services operated by First Cymru (under their "Western Welsh" livery), Transport for Wales Rail and sometimes Great Western Railway respectively, and many villages by local bus services, or community or education transport.

Pembrokeshire is served by rail via the West Wales Lines from Swansea. Direct trains from Milford Haven run to Manchester Piccadilly. Branch lines terminate at Pembroke Dock, Milford Haven and Fishguard, linking with ferries to Ireland from Pembroke Dock and Fishguard. Seasonal ferry services operate from Tenby to Caldey Island, from St Justinians (St Davids) to Ramsey Island and Grassholm Island, and from Martin's Haven to Skomer Island. Haverfordwest (Withybush) Airport provides general aviation services.

Economy
Pembrokeshire's economy now relies heavily on tourism; agriculture, once its most important industry with associated activities such as milling, is still significant. Mining of slate and coal had largely ceased by the 20th century. Since the 1950s, petrochemical and liquid natural gas industries have developed along the Milford Haven Waterway and the county has attracted other major ventures. In 2016, the Rt. Hon. Stephen Crabb, then Welsh Secretary, commented in a government press release: "...with a buoyant local economy, Pembrokeshire is punching above its weight across the UK."

In August 2019, the Pembrokeshire County Show celebrated 60 years at Haverfordwest Showground. The organisers anticipated 100,000 visitors, the largest three-day such event in Wales at the time. It showcased agriculture, food and drink, a rugby club, entertainment, with the star attraction a motorcycle display team.

Agriculture
Until the 12th century, a great extent of Pembrokeshire was virgin woodland. Clearance in the lowland south began under Anglo-Flemish colonisation and under mediaeval tenancies in other areas. Such was the extent of development that by the 16th century there was a shortage of timber in the county. Little is known about mediaeval farming methods, but much arable land was continuously cropped and only occasionally ploughed. By the 18th century, many of the centuries-old open field systems had been enclosed, and much of the land was arable or rough pasture in a ratio of about 1:3.

Estimates of livestock included 17,810 horses, 92,386 cattle, 157,973 sheep and 31,673 pigs. Of 5,981 agricultural holdings, more than half were between 5 and 50 acres.

Pembrokeshire had a flourishing wool industry. There are still working woollen mills at Solva and Tregwynt. One of the last few watermills in Wales producing flour is in St Dogmaels.

Pembrokeshire has good soil and benefits from the Gulf Stream, which provides a mild climate and a longer growing season than other parts of Wales. Pembrokeshire's mild climate means that crops such as its new potatoes (which have protected geographical status under European law) often arrive in British shops earlier in the year than produce from other parts of the UK. Other principal arable crops are oilseed rape, wheat and barley, while the main non-arable activities are dairy farming for milk and cheese, beef production and sheep farming.

The county lends its name to the Pembroke Welsh Corgi, a herding dog whose lineage can be traced back to the 12th century, but which in 2015 was designated as a "vulnerable" breed.

Since 2006, Pembrokeshire Local Action Network for Enterprise and Development (PLANED) has provided a forum to promote an integrated approach to rural development, in which communities, public sector and voluntary partners and specialist interest groups come together to influence policy and promote projects aimed at sustainable agriculture. Sub-groups include promoting food and farming in schools and shortening supply chains.

Fishing

With Pembrokeshire's extensive coastal areas and tidal river estuaries, fishing was an important industry at least from the 16th century. Many ports and villages were dependent on the fishing. The former large sea fishing industry around Milford Haven is now greatly reduced, although limited commercial fishing still takes place. At its peak, Milford was landing over 40,000 tons of fish a year. Pembrokeshire Fish Week is a biennial event which in 2014 attracted 31,000 visitors and generated £3 million for the local economy.

Mining
Slate quarrying was a significant industry in the 19th and early 20th centuries with quarrying taking place at about 100 locations throughout the county. Over 50 coal workings in the Pembrokeshire Coalfield were in existence between the 14th and 20th centuries, with the last coal mine, at Kilgetty, closing in 1950. Pembrokeshire has 61 disused coal tips; only one of these is in Category C (carrying a potential safety risk), but its location has not been disclosed.

Oil, gas and renewable energy
 
There are two oil refineries, two liquified natural gas (LNG) terminals and the 2,000 MW gas-fired Pembroke Power Station (opened in 2012) at Milford Haven. The LNG terminals on the north side of the river, just outside Milford Haven were opened in 2008; a  pipeline connecting Milford Haven to Tirley in Gloucestershire was completed in 2007. The two oil refineries are operated by Chevron (formerly Texaco) producing  and Murco (formerly Amoco/Elf) producing ; the latter was sold to Puma Energy in 2015 with the intention of converting it to a storage facility. At the peak, there were a total of five refineries served from around the Haven: the Esso refinery operated from 1960 to 1983, was demolished in the late 1980s and the site converted into the South Hook LNG terminal; the Gulf Refinery operated from 1968 to 1997 and the site now incorporates the Dragon LNG terminal; BP had an oil terminal at Angle Bay which served its refinery at Llandarcy and operated between 1961 and 1985.

The Pembrokeshire Coast National Park Authority has identified a number of areas in which renewable energy can be, and has been, generated in the county. Following several years of planning after the initial impact studies begun in 2011, the first submarine turbine of three was installed in Ramsey Sound in December 2015. The cumulative impact of single and multiple wind turbines is not without controversy and was the subject of a comprehensive assessment in 2013.

Tourism

Pembrokeshire's tourism portal is Visit Pembrokeshire, run by Pembrokeshire County Council. In 2015 4.3 million tourists visited the county, staying for an average of 5.24 days, spending £585 million; the tourism industry supported 11,834 jobs. Many of Pembrokeshire's beaches have won awards, including Poppit Sands and Newport Sands. In 2018, Pembrokeshire received the most coast awards in Wales, with 56 Blue Flag, Green Coast or Seaside Awards. In the 2019 Wales Coast Awards, 39 Pembrokeshire beaches were recognised, including 11 awarded Blue Flag status.

The Pembrokeshire coastline is a major draw to tourists; in 2011 National Geographic Traveller magazine voted the Pembrokeshire Coast the second best in the world and in 2015 the Pembrokeshire Coast National Park was listed among the top five parks in the world by a travel writer for the Huffington Post. Countryfile Magazine readers voted the Pembrokeshire Coast the top UK holiday destination in 2018, and in 2019 Consumers' Association members placed Tenby and St Davids in the top three best value beach destinations in Britain. With few large urban areas, Pembrokeshire is a "dark sky" destination. The many wrecks off the Pembrokeshire coast attract divers. The decade from 2012 saw significant, increasing numbers of Atlantic bluefin tuna, not seen since the 1960s, and now seen by some as an opportunity to encourage tourist sport fishing.

The county has a number of theme and animal parks (examples are Folly Farm Adventure Park and Zoo, Manor House Wildlife Park, Blue Lagoon Water Park and Oakwood Theme Park), museums and other visitor attractions including Castell Henllys reconstructed Iron Age fort, Tenby Lifeboat Station and Milford Haven's Torch Theatre. There are 21 marked cycle trails around the county.

Pembrokeshire Destination Management Plan for 2020 to 2025 sets out the scope and priorities to grow tourism in Pembrokeshire by increasing its value by 10 per cent in the five years, and to make Pembrokeshire a top five UK destination.

Culture

Flag
The flag of Pembrokeshire is a yellow cross on a blue field; in the centre of the cross is a green pentagon bearing a red and white Tudor rose, divided quarterly and counterchanged, the inner and outer roses having alternating red and white quarters.

Physical heritage

Pembrokeshire has more than 1,600 listed buildings, ranging from mud huts to castles, and including bridges and other ancient and modern structures, under the auspices of Cadw and the County Council. The National Monuments Record of Wales of the Royal Commission on the Ancient and Historical Monuments of Wales identifies nearly 6,000 sites in Pembrokeshire as worthy of study, preservation and recording, including prehistoric and modern buildings, wrecks and natural features. There are 10 National Trust properties in Pembrokeshire.

The arts and media
Music festivals in Pembrokeshire include those at St Davids, Fishguard (folk, jazz and the International Music Festival) and Tenby (Blues Festival). Milford Haven's Torch Theatre produces drama, screens films and holds exhibitions of art and crafts, and there is a theatre-cinema in Fishguard (Theatr Gwaun) and a cinema in Haverfordwest.

Pembrokeshire's coastal landscape and wealth of historic buildings has made it a popular location choice for film and television, including Moby Dick at Fishguard, and the final two Harry Potter films at Freshwater West. Others include:

There are seven local newspapers based in Pembrokeshire: the Western Telegraph (the largest in Pembrokeshire), The Milford Mercury, Tenby Observer, Pembroke Observer, County Echo and The Pembrokeshire Herald (founded 2013. The Milford Mercury (circulation 3,681) and Western Telegraph (circulation 19,582) are part of the Newsquest group. Radio Pembrokeshire, and several other West Wales radio stations, were broadcast from Narberth until 2016, when they were relocated to the Vale of Glamorgan, while retaining satellite offices at Narberth and Milford Marina.

Sport
As the national sport of Wales, rugby union is widely played throughout the county at both town and village level. Haverfordwest RFC, founded in 1875, is a feeder club for Llanelli Scarlets. Village team Crymych RFC in 2014 plays in WRU Division One West. There are numerous football clubs in the county, playing in five leagues.

Triathlon event Ironman Wales has been held in Pembrokeshire since 2011, contributing £3.7 million to the local economy, and the county committed in 2017 to host the event for a further five years. Ras Beca, a mixed road, fell and cross country race attracting UK-wide competitors, has been held in the Preseli Hills annually since 1977. The record of 32 minutes 5 seconds has stood since 1995. Pembrokeshire Harriers athletics club was formed in 2001 by the amalgamation of Cleddau Athletic Club (established 1970) and Preseli Harriers (1989) and is based in Haverfordwest.

The annual Tour of Pembrokeshire road-cycling event takes place over routes of optional length. The 4th Tour, in April 2015, attracted 1,600 riders including Olympic gold medallist Chris Boardman and there were 1,500 entrants to the 2016 event. Part of Route 47 of the Celtic Trail cycle route is in Pembrokeshire. The Llys y Fran Hillclimb is an annual event run by Swansea Motor Club, and there are several other county motoring events held each year.

Abereiddy's Blue Lagoon was the venue for a round of the Red Bull Cliff Diving World Series in 2012, 2013, and 2016; the Welsh Surfing Federation has held the Welsh National Surfing Championships at Freshwater West for several years, and Llys y Fran Country Park hosted the Welsh Dragonboat Championships from 2014 to 2017.

While not at major league level, cricket is played throughout the county and many villages such as Lamphey, Creselly, Llangwm, Llechryd and Crymych field teams in minor leagues under the umbrella of the Cricket Board of Wales.

Notable people

From mediaeval times, Rhys ap Gruffydd (-1197), ruler of the kingdom of Deheubarth, was buried in St Davids Cathedral. and Gerald of Wales was born  at Manorbier Castle. Henry Tudor (later Henry VII) was born in 1457 at Pembroke Castle.

The pirate Bartholomew Roberts (Black Bart) (Welsh: Barti Ddu) was born in Casnewydd Bach, between Fishguard and Haverfordwest in 1682.

In later military history, Jemima Nicholas, heroine of the so-called "last invasion of Britain" in 1797, was from Fishguard, Lieutenant General Sir Thomas Picton GCB, born in Haverfordwest, was killed at the Battle of Waterloo in 1815 and Private Thomas Collins is believed to be the only Pembrokeshire man that fought in the Battle of Rorke's Drift in 1879.

In the arts, siblings Gwen and Augustus John were both born in Pembrokeshire, as was the novelist Sarah Waters; singer Connie Fisher grew up in Pembrokeshire. The actor Christian Bale was born in Haverfordwest.

Stephen Crabb, a former Secretary of State for Work and Pensions and Secretary of State for Wales, was brought up in Pembrokeshire and is one of the county's two Members of Parliament, the other being Simon Hart, who is also the current Secretary of State for Wales.

Education and health

A comprehensive review of education in Pembrokeshire was carried out in 2014 with a number of options for discussion in 2015. In 2018 there were 58 primary schools, eight secondary schools (two for ages 3 to 16) and one special school, in all providing education for more than 18,300 pupils. These include 15 Welsh medium primary schools in the county, three dual stream schools and two transition schools; four primary schools are classified as English Welsh schools (English medium schools with significant use of Welsh). In 2017/18, 22 per cent of seven-year-old pupils were educated through the medium of Welsh. This figure was expected to rise to 25 per cent by 2019/20. In 2019, there were two fewer primary schools. The local authority's education budget  for 2019/2020 was £88 million, equating to £4,856 per pupil. A February 2020 report by schools' inspection body Estyn, however, considered the local authority's performance in education provision "a significant concern".

Pembrokeshire has had a branch of the University of the Third Age (U3A) since 1991 and has a wide range of groups.
 

Health services in the county are provided by Hywel Dda University Health Board which also provides for Ceredigion and Carmarthenshire. The county's principal hospital is Withybush General Hospital in Haverfordwest, with local hospitals in Tenby and Pembroke Dock. In November 2018, the health board informed Pembrokeshire's Community Health Council that the county had 38 full-time and 34 part-time GPs.

See also
 List of national parks of England and Wales
 List of castles in Pembrokeshire
 List of Scheduled prehistoric Monuments in north Pembrokeshire
 List of Scheduled prehistoric Monuments in south Pembrokeshire
 List of Scheduled Roman to modern Monuments in Pembrokeshire
 List of Lord Lieutenants of Pembrokeshire
 List of Custodes Rotulorum of Pembrokeshire
 List of High Sheriffs of Pembrokeshire
 List of MPs for the former county of Pembrokeshire
 Cuisine of Pembrokeshire

Notes

References

Further reading

External links

 Historical information about Pembrokeshire on GENUKI
Pembrokeshire County Council

 Visit Pembrokeshire (official council tourism website)
 Pembrokeshire Cultural Services (archives, libraries, museums)
 Pembrokeshire Historical Society: Pembrokeshire Antiquarians
 19th century Ordnance Survey maps, page 1 and page 2
 List of documents and collections held at Pembrokeshire Archives and Local Studies
 Iolo's Pembrokeshire: BBC Documentary series by Iolo Williams

 
1138 establishments in Europe
Counties of Wales
Historic counties of Wales
Principal areas of Wales
12th-century establishments in Wales